Roy Finch may refer to: 

 Roy G. Finch (1884–1959), American civil engineer and politician from New York
 Roy Finch (footballer) (1922–2007), Welsh professional footballer
 Roy Finch (gridiron football), a running back and return specialist in the Canadian Football League
 Henry LeRoy Finch, known as Roy, American film director

See also
 Finch (surname)